A statue of Eliza R. Snow is installed outside Salt Lake City's Pioneer Memorial Museum, in the U.S. state of Utah. The artwork commemorates pioneer women. The statue was sculpted by Mormon artist Ortho R. Fairbanks.

References

External links

 

Monuments and memorials in Utah
Monuments and memorials to women
Outdoor sculptures in Salt Lake City
Sculptures of women in Utah
Statues in Utah
Statues of writers